Mary O'Rourke (born 31 May 1937) is an Irish former Fianna Fáil politician who served as Leader of the Seanad and Leader of Fianna Fáil in the Seanad from 2002 to 2007, Deputy leader of Fianna Fáil from 1994 to 2002, Minister for Public Enterprise from 1997 to 2002, Minister for Health from 1991 to 1992 and Minister for Education from 1987 to 1991. She also served as a Minister of State from 1992 to 1994. She served as a Teachta Dála (TD) from 1982 to 2002 and 2007 to 2011. She served as a Senator for the Cultural and Educational Panel from 1981 to 1982 and from 2002 to 2007, after being Nominated by the Taoiseach.

Early life

She was born in Athlone, County Westmeath, in 1937. She was educated at St. Peter's, Athlone; Loreto Bray Convent, County Wicklow; University College Dublin and St Patrick's College, Maynooth. She worked as a secondary school teacher before she began her political career.

Political career
O'Rourke began her political career in local politics, serving on Athlone Urban District Council between 1974 and 1987 and on Westmeath County Council between 1979 and 1987. She was elected to Seanad Éireann in 1981 as a Senator for the Cultural and Educational Panel. She stood unsuccessfully for the Dáil at the February 1982 general election, but was subsequently re-elected to the Seanad. At the November 1982 general election, she was first elected to Dáil Éireann as a Fianna Fáil TD for the Longford–Westmeath constituency, and from 1992 for the new Westmeath constituency.

In 1987, she was appointed Minister for Education by Charles Haughey. O'Rourke and her brother, Brian Lenihan, became the first brother and sister in Irish history to serve in the same cabinet. In the November 1991 cabinet reshuffle, O'Rourke became Minister for Health. In February 1992, Charles Haughey resigned as Taoiseach and Fianna Fáil leader. O'Rourke contested the subsequent leadership election along with Michael Woods and Albert Reynolds. Reynolds defeated the other two contenders and O'Rourke was subsequently dropped from her ministerial position, but was appointed to a junior ministry as Minister of State at the Department of Industry and Commerce with responsibility for Trade and Marketing. In January 1993, she was appointed as Minister of State at the Department of Enterprise and Employment with responsibility for Labour Affairs, serving until the fall of the Reynolds government in December 1994.

In 1994, Bertie Ahern became party leader and he appointed O'Rourke as deputy leader of Fianna Fáil, serving in the position until 2002. Following Ahern's election as Taoiseach in June 1997, O'Rourke became Minister for Public Enterprise, holding this position until she lost her Dáil seat at the 2002 general election. This followed a vote management strategy from Fianna Fáil head office which restricted her from campaigning in her traditional areas around Kilbeggan, in an attempt to win 2 of the 3 seats in Westmeath. The loss of her Dáil seat has also been attributed to her association with and the championing of, the privatisation of Telecom Éireann, which proved a financial disaster for many small investors, due to the share price falling radically, post privatisation. During this term as Minister, she also became the subject of public criticism by Ryanair chief executive Michael O'Leary. Following the loss of her Dáil seat, she was nominated to Seanad Éireann as a Senator by Taoiseach Bertie Ahern where she became Leader of the Seanad and leader of Fianna Fáil in the Seanad.

In January 2006, O'Rourke received the party nomination to stand at the 2007 general election. She narrowly defeated her nearest rival and Dáil election running mate, Kevin "Boxer" Moran of Athlone Town Council, causing a controversy when she thanked her election team for working "like blacks." In May 2007, she was re-elected to the Dáil at the 2007 general election, with her highest ever vote.

In November 2008, during a march against the re-introduction of college fees, students from the Athlone Institute of Technology laid a funeral wreath at the door of O'Rourke's constituency office. The card in the wreath stated "Sincere sympathies on the death of free fees. We will remember this." O'Rourke described the act as "heinous". The wreath was placed there because O'Rourke was not speaking at a rally against the fees.

In July 2010, O'Rourke conceded that she did not expect the party to be in power after the next general election. On RTÉ Radio's Today with Pat Kenny programme, O'Rourke said the government was taking tough decisions to steer the country through the financial crisis and this would make it easy for the opposition. She said there was a general air of "crossness" within the Fianna Fáil party over their standing in the polls, but nobody was harboring leadership ambitions to challenge Brian Cowen.

O'Rourke in November 2010 said there was then more to unite her party and Fine Gael than to divide them. She pointed to the common approach of the two parties to Northern Ireland, Europe and the current financial crisis. In an address to the 1916–1921 Club in Dublin Castle last night, she said that most voters no longer defined themselves in terms of Civil War politics. Having pointed to the shared values of the two parties on a number of issues, she said the last issue she wanted to mention was the "dreaded b" word.

Her senior years led her to often being referred to as the "Mammy of the Dáil".

She contested the 2011 general election, but was defeated on the poll. O'Rourke has criticised former Taoiseach Brian Cowen, saying that he should have resigned after his infamous "congested" radio interview. She supported the attack on Cowen by her nephew, former Finance Minister Brian Lenihan, who said he was "disappointed" by Cowen's performance and he had to provide the leadership when the Taoiseach did not.

In retirement, she received a lump sum of €237,000 and an annual pension of €97,000.

Other activities
As well as being a well-known politician, O'Rourke makes regular appearances in the media in a non-political capacity. She has been a contestant on RTÉ's reality series Celebrity Bainisteoir, as well as other shows such as Sex & Sensibility. She has guest presented Tonight with Vincent Browne.

In 2012, Just Mary: My Memoir was published. It won the 2012 Irish Book Award in the "Listeners' Choice" category.

Family
O'Rourke comes from a strong political family, her father Patrick Lenihan served as a TD for Longford–Westmeath from 1965 to 1970. Her brother Brian Lenihan was a senior government Minister and Tánaiste. Another brother Paddy Lenihan was a County Councillor in Roscommon, but resigned from Fianna Fáil in 1983 and became associated with Neil Blaney's Independent Fianna Fáil party. Two of her nephews, Brian Lenihan Jnr and Conor Lenihan, both sons of her brother Brian, served as Ministers. Brian Lenihan Jnr was the Minister for Finance. Conor Lenihan was a Minister of State.

O'Rourke was widowed in January 2001, following the death of her husband, Enda. She has two sons. One of them, Aengus O'Rourke (her adopted son), ran for Athlone Town Council in 2009. The other son, Feargal O'Rourke, became Managing Partner of PriceWaterHouseCoopers in Ireland in 2015 and is considered the "grand architect" of the double Irish tax system, a major contributor to Ireland's economic success in attracting US multinationals to Ireland.

See also
Families in the Oireachtas

References

1937 births
Living people
Alumni of St Patrick's College, Maynooth
Alumni of University College Dublin
Fianna Fáil TDs
Fianna Fáil senators
Irish schoolteachers
Mary
Local councillors in County Westmeath
Members of the 15th Seanad
Members of the 16th Seanad
Members of the 21st Seanad
Members of the 22nd Seanad
20th-century women members of Seanad Éireann
21st-century women members of Seanad Éireann
Members of the 24th Dáil
Members of the 25th Dáil
Members of the 26th Dáil
Members of the 27th Dáil
Members of the 28th Dáil
Members of the 30th Dáil
20th-century women Teachtaí Dála
21st-century women Teachtaí Dála
Ministers for Education (Ireland)
Ministers for Health (Ireland)
Ministers for Transport (Ireland)
Ministers of State of the 26th Dáil
Ministers of State of the 27th Dáil
Nominated members of Seanad Éireann
People from Athlone
Politicians from County Westmeath
Presidential appointees to the Council of State (Ireland)
Virgin Media Television (Ireland) presenters
Women government ministers of the Republic of Ireland
Women ministers of state of the Republic of Ireland